Cibola Bridge is a bridge in La Paz County, in the U.S. state of Arizona, crossing the border between Arizona and California into Imperial County, in the U.S. state of California.

References

Road bridges in Arizona
Road bridges in California
Transportation buildings and structures in Imperial County, California
Transportation in La Paz County, Arizona
Buildings and structures in La Paz County, Arizona